Oberonia flavescens, commonly known as the northern green fairy orchid, is a plant in the orchid family and is a clump-forming epiphyte or lithophyte. It has between four and six leaves in a fan-like arrangement on each shoot and a large number of whitish to yellowish flowers arranged in whorls of between six and eight around the flowering stem. It is endemic to Queensland.

Description
Oberonia flavescens is an epiphytic or lithophytic herb that forms large clumps. Flowering occurs between February and July.

Taxonomy and naming
Oberonia flavescens was first formally described in 2006 by David Jones and Mark Clements who published the description in Australian Orchid Research. The type specimen was grown in the Australian National Botanic Gardens from a plant collected in the McIlwraith Range. The specific epithet (flavescens) is derived from the Latin word flavus meaning "golden-yellow" or "yellow" with the suffix -escens meaning "beginning of" or "becoming".

Distribution and habitat
The northern green fairy orchid usually grows on trees and rocks in rainforest, sometimes in other humid, sheltered places such as mangroves. It is found between the Iron and Clarke Ranges in Queensland.

References

flavescens
Endemic orchids of Australia
Plants described in 2006
Orchids of Queensland